Silkijhar is a village in Kamrup rural district, situated in south bank of river Brahmaputra.

Transport
The village is near National Highway 37 and connected to nearby towns and cities with regular buses and other modes of transportation.

See also
 Uparhali
 Topatali

References

Villages in Kamrup district